Chuqi Tanka (Aymara chuqi gold, tanka hat or biretta, "gold hat", also spelled Choquetanga) is a  mountain in the Andes of Bolivia. It is located in the La Paz Department, Murillo Province, La Paz Municipality, near the border with the Coroico Municipality of the Nor Yungas Province. Chuqi Tanka lies east of Ch'uñawi.

References 

Mountains of La Paz Department (Bolivia)